Spaghetti Nightmares is a reference book on Italian horror films by Luca M. Palmerini and Gaetano Mistretta.  The book consists mainly of interviews (translated into English) with major genre icons.  The book was published in 1996.

List of persons interviewed 
 Fabrizio De Angelis
 Claudio Argento
 Dario Argento
 Lamberto Bava
 Mario Caiano
 Stefania Casini
 Luigi Cozzi
 Armando Crispino
 Ruggero Deodato
 Mimsy Farmer
 Franco Ferrini
 Claudio Fragasso
 Lucio Fulci
 Umberto Lenzi
 Antonio Margheriti
 Aristide Massaccessi
 Luigi Montefiori (aka George Eastman)
 Daria Nicolodi
 Giannetto de Rossi
 Dardano Sacchetti
 Tom Savini
 Romano Scavolini
 Michele Soavi
 Terence Stamp
 David Warbeck
 Bernardino Zapponi

Publication information
 Spaghetti Nightmares by Luca M. Palmerini and Gaetano Mistretta, Fantasma Books, Key West, Florida, 1996.

1996 non-fiction books
Books about film
Books of interviews